The Chrabliyine Mosque (also transliterated as Shirabliyyin, Cherabliyine, etc.) is a Marinid-era mosque in Fez, Morocco.

History 
The mosque was founded in the 14th century during the Marinid period. Although the exact date and patron of its construction is not confirmed, it is believed to have been was built by the Marinid sultan Abu al-Hasan during his reign between 1331 and 1348 CE. Abu al-Hasan was one of the most prolific builders of the Marinid era, and was responsible for building several madrasas and mosques in Fes and beyond. The mosque was considerably restored under the reign of the Alaouite sultan Moulay Slimane between 1792 and 1822. Only the minaret and the mosque entrance are still essentially in their original Marinid form, while the appearance of the rest of the mosque generally dates from the Alaouite restoration. The Mosque of Abu al-Hasan to the west, built by the same ruler in 1341 and similarly renovated by Moulay Slimane, bears a number of resemblances with this building.

Location and origin of name 
The mosque is located on Tala'a Kebira, the main souq (market) street and artery of Fes el-Bali, the old city of Fez, from which its minaret is prominently visible. The surrounding district is also referred to as Chrabliyine, a name which refers to a type of traditional Moroccan women's shoe called "cherbil" in which the local shops specialized (and still do to some extent today).

Architecture

Minaret and exterior 
The mosque is considered notable for its minaret, which is particularly well-decorated in the medieval Moroccan-Andalusian style (evolved from earlier Almohad models), making use of the darj-w-ktaf or sebka pattern (resembling palmettes or fleur-de-lys shapes) covering much of the facades, as well as polylobed arch motifs near the base, merlons at the top, and multicolored mosaic tiles (zellij) that fill in the empty spaces. One of these tile mosaics, on the side of the minaret overlooking the interior courtyard, features a notable inscription in the "square" kufic style. The colourful mosaic tilework of the minaret were likely added in the reign of Moulay Slimane (between 1792 and 1822), although the wide band of zellij at the top is most likely part of the original Marinid design.

The main street entrance to the mosque is directly below the minaret and is overlooked by a canopy of carved wood. The street facade of the building also includes spaces for two shops.

Interior 

The interior of the mosque features a rectangular courtyard (roughly 11 by 5 meters) that can be accessed directly from the street entrance and which is flanked on either side by annexes. The courtyard, like that of many mosques, features a marble fountain in its center, while on its north/western side is also an entrance to an ablutions room. On its southern/eastern side is the prayer hall, featuring two transverse naves formed by rows of five horseshoe arches parallel to the qibla wall (i.e. the wall towards which prayers face). The mihrab, a decorative alcove or niche in the qibla wall that symbolizes the direction of prayer, is a small octagonal space topped by a dome of muqarnas. On either side of the mihrab are two small doors leading to other rooms. The eastern one (on the left) connects to a "mosque of the dead" or funerary mosque (Jama' el-Gnaiz), a space used for funerary rites and prayers around the bodies of the deceased before they are buried. (This space is attached but separate from the rest of the mosque in order to protect the cleanliness and sanctity of the main prayer space.) Both this funerary space and the main prayer hall can also be accessed by smaller secondary entrances from the street on the eastern side of the building.

Ablutions facility 
Directly across the street from the mosque is a mida'a (Arabic: ميضأة‎), a facility that allowed Muslims to perform ablutions. The facility consists of an internal courtyard which was reached through a bent corridor from the street entrance. At the middle of the courtyard is a rectangular water basin, decorated with simple tilework, while around the courtyard are multiple small rooms which contain latrines.

See also
  Lists of mosques 
  List of mosques in Africa
  List of mosques in Morocco

References

Mosques in Fez, Morocco
Marinid architecture
14th-century establishments in Morocco